William Grundy (18 May 1923 – 9 February 1993) was an English journalist and broadcaster, best known for his work as anchor of Today, a regional magazine programme on Thames Television in London.

In the latter role, Grundy gained national attention for his interview with the Sex Pistols in 1976, during which he contemptuously encouraged a barrage of profanity while supposedly intoxicated on live television. The interview effectively destroyed Grundy's career, elevated the Sex Pistols to notoriety, and signalled the arrival of mainstream punk rock.

Biography
The son of a foreman at Gorton Locomotive Works (Gorton Tank), Grundy was born in Manchester in 1923 and educated at the University of Manchester, where he read geology.

He began his career as a geologist and as a part-time journalist. When Granada Television began broadcasting in May 1956, Grundy auditioned for the post of newsreader, which at first he held in tandem with his geological work. During his time at Granada, he established himself as a reporter and presenter for the station's regional programming, including People and Places, Northern Newscast, Scene at 6:30 and Granada in the North, alongside such contemporaries as Gay Byrne, Chris Kelly, Michael Parkinson, Mike Scott and Brian Trueman.

On the night of the assassination of John F. Kennedy, Grundy anchored a late-night news special for the Granada region, alongside Mike Scott, who broke the story on Scene at 6:30 that evening. He also fronted Granada's coverage of elections, the main political party conferences and the Trades Union Congress.

Grundy was also a producer at Granada, working on the long-running history series All Our Yesterdays and early editions of the current affairs programme World in Action.

In 1967, he produced a children's drama series, The Flower of Gloster (1967). The serial, about four youngsters who take a narrow boat from North Wales to London, was broadcast as a 13-part weekly series. Based on a 1911 book of the same name by E. Temple Thurston, it was Granada TV's first venture into colour. Grundy also wrote a book of the same name, basically an updated version of Thurston's original.

As well as writing a regular column for Punch magazine, Grundy also played himself in the 1974 film version of Man About the House, but he is best remembered for hosting the Today show in London, after moving from Granada to Thames.

In an early faux pas, he filmed a piece-to-camera while reporting on the Ilford North by-election and was deeply critical of the constituency. Unfortunately, he was filming in Ilford South at the time.

In 1975, Grundy went on to present an educational programme called The Land for Independent Television's schools and colleges programming.

The Today incident
Queen were booked for the Today show of 1 December 1976, but they cancelled their appearance at the last minute due to vocalist Freddie Mercury needing emergency dental surgery. They were replaced by the Sex Pistols, the punk band, appearing at short notice accompanied by their entourage. The show was broadcast live and uncensored on weekdays in the early evening, a time when spoken obscenities were forbidden.

The interview began with Grundy introducing the band, stating "they are as drunk as I am", although Grundy later denied being intoxicated during the interview to the press.

The interview resumed following a playing of the music video for the song "Anarchy in the U.K.". It was evident Grundy was attempting to provoke the band from the beginning of the interview, speaking to viewers instead of directly to them and referring to them as "that group" – in his challenging of them over what he felt was possible hypocrisy – in terms of the philosophy of punk. Initially, he received mocking but relatively innocuous responses from then-bassist Glen Matlock.

Grundy said "I am told... that that group... have received £40,000 from record company.... Doesn't that seem, uh, to be slightly opposed to your anti-materialistic view of life?" The response to this goad were two comments: One was an indecipherable syllable (or two) from one band member, while Matlock responded with "No, the more the merrier." When Grundy asked the band to explain further, what followed would be the first example of profanity during the interview, when Steve Jones quipped: "We fuckin' spent it ain't we?" Grundy did not comment on the profanity but responded "I don't know, have you?” Matlock confirmed that the money had all gone "down the boozer," as it was expressed by Jones. Grundy then asked the band "are you serious?" in reference to their music, comparing them to musicians such as Beethoven, Mozart, Bach and Brahms. Johnny Rotten (John Lydon) sarcastically replied "They're all heroes of ours, ain't they?". When Grundy inquired further, Lydon went on, stating "Oh yes, they’re wonderful people, they really turn us on!" Grundy responded with, "What if they turn other people on?" to which Lydon dismissively remarked, "That's just their tough shit!" When challenged by Grundy, Lydon said, "Nothing, a rude word! Next question." asking Grundy to go on with the interview. Grundy insisted that Lydon repeat what he had said. When Lydon did so, "shit", Grundy tauntingly retorted, "Good heavens, you frightened me to death," to which Lydon called him "Siegfried" as Matlock muttered that Grundy was "like [a] dad... or [a] granddad."

Grundy then turned his attention to the female members of the band's entourage, known as The Bromley Contingent appearing with them and which included Siouxsie Sioux. He asked, "What about you girls, behind? Are you worried, or are you just enjoying yourself?" To which Sioux responded, "enjoying myself". Grundy responded "Are you?" to which she and Simone Thomas chorused "Yeah." Grundy responded "Ah, that's what I thought you were doing." That prompted a large exhalation from a band member. Sioux said, "I've always wanted to meet you", to which Grundy responded by saying, "Did you really? We'll meet afterwards, shall we?" Interpreting this as a sexual comment, Jones began openly insulting Grundy, calling him a "dirty sod" and a "dirty old man." Grundy further provoked Jones to "say something outrageous", a challenge that Jones met by calling Grundy a "dirty bastard" and a "dirty fucker". Grundy responded, "What a clever boy!" and Jones added "What a fucking rotter!" As the show ended and the credits rolled, Grundy mouthed, "Oh shit" as the band began dancing to the closing theme.

Although Today was only a regional programme for London, it became a national story due to coverage and comment by the tabloid press. As a result, Grundy was suspended for two weeks. The head of programming for Thames, Jeremy Isaacs, described the incident as "a gross error of judgment" leading from "inexcusably sloppy journalism". The commercial television regulator of the day, the Independent Broadcasting Authority accepted the franchise holders' argument that the incident could not have been prevented. Grundy in his defence said he had set out "to prove that these louts were a foul-mouthed set of yobs. And that is what I did prove". Today was cancelled two months later. In a 2008 poll conducted by FremantleMedia, at this point Thames' parent company, the Today show interview was the most requested TV clip ever.

Post-Today
The broadcast harmed Grundy's television career. By 1979, he was presenting a book review programme, A Better Read, broadcast not in the early evening like Today, but on Sunday mornings.

In 1980, while filming "Changing Trains", an episode for the BBC TV travel documentary Great Railway Journeys of the World, he "apparently [fell] down the neck of a whisky bottle, in Zurich", and, after being "air-freighted home", was replaced by Eric Robson.

His slot on What the Papers Say in the early 1980s was his last on network television, although he continued to present on BBC North West on such regional shows as Sweet and Sour and The Lancashire Lads into the mid-1980s. He also appeared as an interviewer in ITV's adaptation of A Kind of Loving in 1982 and worked on schools programmes for Granada, including a stint presenting Politics - What's It All About?.

In July 1986, Grundy was lead compère for the Festival of the Tenth Summer at the newly opened Greater Manchester Exhibition Centre (GMEX), a week-long celebration of the anniversary of the Sex Pistols' performance at the Lesser Free Trade Hall. Grundy was chosen for the role by organiser Tony Wilson, in a knowing nod to the 'Today incident' and Grundy's unhappy association with the Sex Pistols.

Grundy died of a heart attack at a nursing home in Stockport, on 9 February 1993, aged 69.

He had four sons and two daughters. His son Tim Grundy was a radio presenter in the Greater Manchester area – most notably at Piccadilly Radio and Key 103 – and a TV presenter until his death in 2009.

Michael Parkinson, who worked with Bill Grundy at Granada in the 1960s, described him as: A difficult man to keep sober, but not to produce. He was one of the best front men I ever worked with...At his best he was a superb forensic interviewer...sadly, as his career drifted, he let drink overwhelm his personality.

References

External links

Transcript of interview with the Sex Pistols
Manchester Celebrities

1923 births
1993 deaths
English television presenters
Mass media people from Manchester
Sex Pistols
Obscenity controversies in music
Obscenity controversies in television
Television controversies in the United Kingdom